The Bureau of Alcohol, Tobacco, Firearms and Explosives is a federal law enforcement organization within the US Department of Justice.

ATF may also refer to:

Organizations
 American Type Founders, former dominant American manufacturer of metal type
 As Trustee For, a legal term for an entity acting as a trustee; see Trust law
 Asia Task Force, a committee of UK businesses, informing the UK response to globalisation
 Asian Tennis Federation, a continental body of national tennis associations of Asian countries
 Atlantic Theatre Festival, a professional theatre company located in Wolfville, Nova Scotia, Canada

Places
 French Southern and Antarctic Lands (ISO 3166 country code)
 Chachoan Airport (IATA code), Ambato, Ecuador

Science and technology
 Anatomical transfer function, the mathematical description of sound wave propagation through the human body
 Activating transcription factor, a class of DNA-binding proteins that regulate gene transcription
 Activating transcription factor 2, such a factor encoded by the ATF2 gene in humans
 Artificial transcription factor, a type of engineered protein used in gene modulation
 Automatic transmission fluid, the liquid medium used in hydraulic automatic transmission systems
 Automated Testing Framework, a software testing framework
 Automated Telescope Facility, a robotic telescope built by the University of Iowa
 Aviation turbine fuel, for jet aircraft

Music
 After the Fire, a 1970s and 1980s rock band
 Around the Fur, an album by American rock band Deftones
 "ATF", a song on the album Feeler by The Toadies
 "ATF", a rap song on the album It's Dark and Hell Is Hot by DMX

Military
 Advanced Tactical Fighter, a program undertaken by the United States Air Force to develop a next-generation air superiority fighter
 ATF, the United States Navy hull classification symbol for a fleet ocean tug
 ATF Dingo, a German heavily armored military infantry mobility vehicle
 1 ATF, the 1st Australian Task Force, which commanded Australian and New Zealand's troops in the Vietnam War

Other uses
 A.T.F., a 1999 television film produced for the American Broadcasting Company
 ATF (video game), a computer game released by Digital Integration
 Acquire the Fire, a Christian youth conference series run by Teen Mania Ministries
 About The Fit, a fictional startup in the film The Intern (2015 film)

See also
 Accelerator Test Facility (disambiguation)